Spike Island was founded as a limited company Artspace Bristol Ltd (Artists' Studio Provision) in 1976 by a group of six artists in a disused Victorian building next to Bristol's docks.

In December 1998 Artspace Bristol Limited changed its name to Spike Island Artspace Ltd. It now occupies a former Brooke Bond tea packing factory on Spike Island, Bristol. Spike Island is a place for the production and exhibition of contemporary art and design.

Exhibitions

In 2015 Spike Island became a member of the Plus Tate network which now has 35 members. The Plus Tate network brings together a variety of organisations from all parts of the UK, including Fruitmarket Gallery, John Hansard Gallery, Modern Art Oxford and Nottingham Contemporary. 

It offers a public programme of art exhibitions, talks and events. Exhibitions have included artists such as Ged Quinn, Andy Holden, David Batchelor, Ivan Seal, Richard Long, Corita Kent and Ciara Phillips.

Studios

Spike Island has over 70 artist studios. It is home to Spike Design, a co-working, incubator space for start-up creative businesses. Spike Island Test Space is a project exhibition space on the top floor and is run by studio holders. Test Space exhibitions are featured alongside the main Spike Island exhibition space.

Archives
Records of Spike Island Artspace are held at Bristol Archives (Ref. 45338) (online catalogue).

References

External links
 Spike Island Artspace website

Artist cooperatives
Arts in Bristol
Arts organisations based in the United Kingdom
Organisations based in Bristol
Arts organizations established in 1976
1976 establishments in England
Co-operatives in England